The Dampf-Kleinbahn Mühlenstroth (DKBM) is a voluntarily run 600mm narrow gauge steam railway in Gütersloh, Germany.
The railway was opened in 1973 to be able to present the corresponding associations collection of vintage narrow gauge railway vehicles to the public. 
It consists of approximately 1.5 km of track that is set up to allow different types of operations.

History 

In 1971 a group of narrow gauge railway enthusiasts purchased a small 0-4-0 750mm gauged steam locomotive from a scrap merchant with the aim of running it on the Zillertal Railway in Austria. However when nearing completion of the locomotives restoration in Mülheim an der Ruhr the situation at the Zillertal Railway changed, eliminating the need for this locomotive. Thus a fellow enthusiast from Gütersloh allowed the locomotives owners to construct a railway on the grounds of his inn to be able to run the Locomotive. Because of the comparatively small size of the piece of land the Locomotive was regauged to 600mm to allow tighter curves to be used on the railway. It so comes that in 1972 the "Dampf-Kleinbahn Mühlenstroth e.V." a registered charitable association was founded to own and run the new Railway. Operations commenced on June the 10th 1973 having constructed the entire railway including three coaches from scratch. The railway has run every year since, while the rolling stock collection has grown considerably.

The collection 

The railways rolling stock consists mainly of wagons and coaches formerly used at the "Muskau Forest Railway" (WEM) and the "Mecklenburg-Pomeranian Narrow Gauge Railway" (MPSB), both run by the former East German state railways, Deutsche Reichsbahn. They were either sourced directly from the WEM or via Berlins Children's Railway. The Locomotives include small industrial and larger light railway steam locomotives. The railway has also gathered an interesting collection of large diesel locomotives over the years. In the summer months the mainstay of coaches are of the open type used during the First World War by the German army and were last in use on the WEM. The closed passenger coaches consist of some self built vehicles and two former MPSB coaches, there are also two former MPSB guards vans.

Steam Locomotives

Diesel Locomotives

Operations 

Originally the train ran around the field on a simple circuit with only one station: "Postdamm". This was soon complemented by a second station, named "Rödelheim" on the opposite side to make two train operations possible. Then a third station called "Mühlenstroth Kleinbahnhof" was built next to the engine shed and workshop in the centre of the circuit and connected to it via a rail triangle.

Now an end to end service form "Mühlenstroth Klb" via "Rödelheim" to "Postdamm" with the locomotive running around its train at both ends was introduced. This is the standard procedure on normal running days. The operating season traditionally begins May 1 and ends on the last Sunday of September. However since 1992 the railway runs its "Nikolausfahrten" (Santa Specials) on selected weekends in December. The DKBM celebrates every 5th anniversary with a gala event which sees all operational locomotives in steam and sometimes features guest engines from other railways.

Since 2012 there is an annual special event called the "Kleinbahntage" on which the railway aims to recreate operations and scenes as they would have been experienced on a rural light railway in the 1950s and 1960s. This sees trains running from "Mühlenstroth Kleinbahnhof" to "Mühlenstroth Kleinbahnhof" via "Rödelheim" and "Postdamm" and back again, thus simulating an end to end line with two intermediate stops.

Other railways

The DKBM maintains friendly relations with other steam railways such as the "Berlin Park Railway" (ex Berlin Children's Railway) and the WEM. This includes the exchange of personnel and guest locomotives both long and short term.

References

Literature

Dampf-Kleinbahn Mühlenstroth e.V.: Von der Hobby-Eisenbahn zur Museumseisenbahn. 40 Jahre Dampf-Kleinbahn Mühlenstroth. Gütersloh 2014

External links
http://dampfkleinbahn.de

1973 establishments in Germany
Narrow gauge railways in Germany
600 mm gauge railways in Germany